Philobryidae is a taxonomic family of very small equivalved triangular saltwater clams, marine bivalve molluscs, related to the ark clams and the bittersweets.  Their shells have projecting umbones and are non-nacreous.  The ligament of the hinge is either completely internal or only slightly external.  They have only one adductor muscle scar on the inside of each of their shells as opposed to the more-common two. Species from this family are found in most seas, in shallow to moderately deep water. This family contains about sixty species in seven genera.

Species
Species within the family Philobryidae include:
 Aupouria
 Adacnarca Pelseneer, 1903
 Adacnarca limopsoides Thiele, 1912
 Adacnarca nitens Pelseneer, 1903
 Cosa Finlay, 1927
 Cosa auriculata
 Cosa bordaensis
 Cosa brasiliensis Klappenbach, 1966
 Cosa caribaea Abbott, 1958
 Cosa celsa
 Cosa costata
 Cosa crebreradiata
 Cosa filholi
 Cosa fimbriata
 Cosa parallelogramma
 Cosa pectinata
 Cosa pharetra
 Cosa sagana
 Cosa scabra
 Cosa stephensensis
 Cosa tardiradiata
 Cosa tatei
 Cosa tholiatus
 Cosa waikikia
 Cratis
 Cratis antillensis (Dall, 1881)
 Cratis pentodon (Aguayo & Borro, 1946)
 Lissarca Smith, 1879
 Lissarca miliaris Philippi, 1845
 Lissarca notorcadensis Melvill & Standen, 1907
 Lissarca rubrofusca E. A. Smith, 1877
 Philobrya Carpenter, 1872
 Philobrya acutangula Powell, 1935
 Philobrya atlantica Dall, 1896
 Philobrya australis
 Philobrya barbarta Thiele, 1912
 Philobrya brattstromi
 Philobrya capillata Dell, 1964
 Philobrya crenatulifera
 Philobrya crispa Linse, 2002
 Philobrya dentimargo
 Philobrya hamiltoni (Hedley, 1916)
 Philobrya inconspicua Olsson & McGinty, 1958
 Philobrya inornata
 Philobrya laevis
 Philobrya limoides
 Philobrya meleagrina (Bernard, 1896)
 Philobrya meridionalis (Smith, 1885)
 Philobrya modiolus (Suter, 1913)
 Philobrya munita (Finlay, 1930)
 Philobrya obesa Powell, 1958
 Philobrya olstadi (Soot-Ryen, 1951)
 Philobrya pileata
 Philobrya pinctada (Finlay, 1930)
 Philobrya quadrata Pfeiffer, 1886
 Philobrya recapitula
 Philobrya scabra
 Philobrya sculpturalis (Dell, 1956
 Philobrya setosa
 Philobrya squamea
 Philobrya sublaevis Pelseneer, 1903
 Philobrya tumidula
 Philobrya ungulata Pfeiffer, 1886
 Philobrya wandelensis Lamy, 1906
 Verticipronus Hedley, 1904
 Verticipronus mytilus Hedley, 1904

References

 Powell A. W. B., New Zealand Mollusca, William Collins Publishers Ltd, Auckland, New Zealand 1979 

 
Bivalve families